A dual-code rugby international is a rugby footballer who has played at the senior international level in both codes of rugby, 13-a-side rugby league and 15-a-side rugby union.

Rugby league started as a breakaway version of rugby in Northern England in 1895 and in New Zealand and Australia in 1908, and consequently a number of early top-class rugby league players had been star players in the rugby union code. Accordingly, a high proportion of Australia and New Zealand's dual-code rugby internationals played in rugby league's formative years in those countries.

From 1910 to 1995, dual-code internationals were infrequent and with the single exception of Karl Ifwersen, the player had always first appeared as a union international before shifting to league, due to strict bans applied by administrators in rugby union, which remained amateur, to those players who crossed to the professional code. In 1995 rugby union itself turned professional and the tide of switches began to reverse. Since then the vast majority of cross-code representatives have debuted internationally in league before moving to union where there is now a larger audience and more money available.

Backs have more often been successful at the highest level of both games than forwards – approximately 65% of the players here listed are backs, although pre-1995 many notable forwards moved from union to league. Since 1995 nearly 90% of the league to union converts who went on to play internationally have been backs.

The following is an incomplete list of dual-code internationals, listed by country.

Australia

England

Fiji

France

Hong Kong
Qualifying on residency, New Zealand-born Jack Nielsen became Hong Kong's first dual-code international when the Hong Kong rugby league team played their first ever international match in November 2017.

Ireland

Italy

Germany

Malta

New Zealand
There have been 36 New Zealand dual-code internationals. Only four people became dual-code internationals after first representing New Zealand in rugby league: Karl Ifwersen, Sonny Bill Williams, Matt Duffie and Roger Tuivasa-Sheck.

All Golds

The 1907 Professional All Blacks (derisively referred to by the New Zealand press as the All Golds) left New Zealand in August 1907 for their ground-breaking tour of Britain via Sydney. The squad contained eight former All Blacks in George Smith, Thomas Cross, William Mackrell, Herbert Turtill, Duncan McGregor, Eric Watkins, Massa Johnston and Edgar Wrigley. These men became New Zealand's first dual-code internationals at the point they first played on the ten-month tour.

The three matches in Sydney between 17 and 24 August against professional New South Wales rugby rebels were played under rugby union rules so do not qualify as international rugby league appearances. But full internationals under "Northern Union" (rugby league) rules were played against Wales in Aberdare on 1 Januard 1908 and three Tests against Great Britain in Leeds on 25 January 1907, Chelsea on 8 February 1907 and Cheltenham on 15 February 1908. Three Test matches were played in Australia on the homeward leg before the All Golds arrived home in June 1908 having played 48 games (tour matches and Tests) as internationals.

Samoa

Scotland

South Africa

Tonga

United States

Wales
With 99, Wales have more than twice the number of dual-code rugby internationals than any other country.

More than one country

Dally Messenger

Messenger played for Australia in rugby union, and for both New Zealand and Australia in rugby league. One week after his final Test appearance as a Wallaby, Messenger, who was born in Australia, toured Great Britain at the invitation of the New Zealand All Golds in 1907. He made his international rugby league debut on that tour representing New Zealand. His Australian international Test debut was made in Sydney in Australia's inaugural rugby league Test v the Kiwis on 9 May 1908. He made six further international rugby league appearances for Australia.

Emosi Koloto

Koloto grew up in New Zealand playing rugby union and represented Tonga in the code before switching to league and moving to England. He was called up into the Kiwis in 1991 from the Widnes club and played five tests that year.

John Schuster

Schuster first played rugby union, representing both Samoa and New Zealand. Later he switched to rugby league and captained Western Samoa in two pool games at the 1995 World Cup.

Henry Paul

Paul was born in New Zealand. His senior club rugby league career was played in England but between 1995 and 2001 he regularly returned to New Zealand to make international appearances for the Kiwis. When he switched to union in 2002 he became eligible to represent England by ancestry of his grandfather and he did so in 2002.

Brad Thorn

Thorn was born in Mosgiel, New Zealand. From age eight he played rugby league in Queensland and aged twenty-two he played for Australia during the Super League split year. When the code reunited in 1998 he also played for Australia.

In 2001 he moved to New Zealand and switched to rugby union. He appeared in twelve Tests for New Zealand (the All Blacks) from 2003. For 2005–06 he returned to the National Rugby League in Australia, winning a premiership with the Brisbane Broncos and playing at state level again. In 2008 he switched to rugby union for a second time and was again selected for the All Blacks.

Michael Horak

Horak was born in South Africa and represented South Africa in rugby league. He switched to rugby union in 1998 moving to England to play with the Leicester Tigers. He qualifies to represent England via his English mother and did so in 2002.

Lesley Vainikolo

Vainikolo was born in Tonga but raised in New Zealand playing rugby league at school. His league club career was played with the Canberra Raiders in Australia and the Bradford Bulls in England. During that period he made twelve national representative appearances for New Zealand (the Kiwis).

He took up rugby union with Gloucester Rugby in 2007. He was eligible to play for Tonga by birth, New Zealand by parentage or England by residence. He had previously declined to play for Tonga in the 2007 Rugby World Cup so that he could play for his adopted nation. He made his international rugby union debut for England v Wales in February 2008 and played in five tests that season.

Craig Gower

After a successful eleven year Australian rugby league career from 1996 to 2007 with the Penrith Panthers, during which he made five State of Origin appearances for New South Wales and twenty-three Test appearances for Australia (5 for the Super League team and 18 for the ARL team), Gower moved to Europe, switched codes and signed with French rugby union side Bayonne from 2008. He is eligible to play for Italy through his Italian grandfather. He was selected for Italy on their mid-season tour of Australia and New Zealand in 2009.

Shontayne Hape

Hape, a New Zealand Mãori, had a very successful rugby league career in both hemispheres, first with the New Zealand Warriors in the NRL (1999–2002) and then with the Bradford Bulls in the Super League (2003–2008). He made his Test debut for New Zealand in the 2004 Tri-Nations, and eventually appeared in 14 Tests for New Zealand. Hape switched codes in 2008, signing with Bath, for whom he still plays. Under IRB rules, he was already eligible to represent England on residency grounds, having lived there for well over the three years required to qualify. Hape made his union Test debut for England in 2010 against Australia.

Maurie Fa'asavalu

Maurie Fa'asavalu is a Samoan rugby union player who formerly played rugby league for St Helens. He was picked in the Great Britain rugby league squad after living in England for 4 years. He also played for England in the 2008 Rugby League World Cup

Bill Hardcastle

A New Zealander and an 1897 All Black, Hardcastle journeyed to Sydney in 1899 on hearing that the visiting British rugby union team would be not be travelling to New Zealand. Australian rugby in those days had no residential rules and once he joined Sydney's Glebe RU club he qualified for Australian national selection. He was chosen for Australia in the fourth test of 1899 against Great Britain.

In rugby league he made two Test appearances for Australia and six minor appearances on the 1908 Kangaroo tour.

Va'aiga Tuigamala

Tuigamala was nicknamed 'Inga the Winger' and initially represented New Zealand in rugby union. He then switched codes, joining Wigan in 1993. While playing league he represented Western Samoa at the 1995 World Cup. When rugby union turned professional he returned to his original code. Between 1996 and 2000 he represented Samoa in rugby union.

Lote Tuqiri

Born in Fiji, Tuqiri was a junior Australian rugby league international at age 19 in 1998. When he missed selection for Australia's 2000 Rugby League World Cup squad he opted to play for Fiji and captained the side in their three pool match appearances. He later played four rugby league Tests for Australia in 2001 before his 2003 switch to union and a long international representative career in that code.

Fred Jackson

Jackson toured Australasia with the 1908 Anglo-Welsh Lions. However, during the tour he was accused of professionalism and recalled to England by the Rugby Football Union. Jackson left the touring party but failed to return to England to face the accusations. In 1910 Jackson played rugby league in New Zealand and represented both Auckland and New Zealand against the touring Great Britain side.

First dual-code rugby international
England's Anthony Starks and Wales' Jack Rhapps took the field in the inaugural rugby league international of 5 April 1904 between England and Other Nationalities Starks had made two rugby union Test appearances for England in 1896, and Rhapps had made a single rugby union Test appearance for Wales in 1897, and thus in April 1904 they became the world's first dual rugby code internationals.

The first tour matches played by the New Zealand All Golds in Britain in Nov & Dec 1907 would have seen international cross-code debuts by some of the seven touring former All Blacks. At this stage of the tour the New Zealanders were still familiarising themselves with the new Northern Union rules which they had not seen until they arrived in Leeds in October. The first full international of the tour against Wales on New Year's Day 1908 saw confirmed appearances by Mackrell, Turtill, Wrigley, Johnston & Cross  for New Zealand and David Jones for Wales. Thus New Zealand's first five dual-code rugby internationals all achieved that feat in the same match.

Other firsts and lasts
 First man to debut in rugby league before debuting in union – Karl Ifwersen Sep 1921
 Last man to debut in rugby league before debuting in rugby union – Marika Koroibete, October 2013
 Last man to debut in rugby union before debuting in rugby league – Mirco Bergamasco, October 2016
 Most recent dual rugby code international – Marika Koroibete, September 2017

Dual-code internationals who also represented in a third sport
Michael Cleary represented Australia in track & field at the Commonwealth Games making him an international at the senior level in three sports. Dick Thornett achieved the same distinction having also represented for Australia in water polo at the 1960 Rome Olympics. Dai Bishop represented Wales in British Baseball.

See also
Comparison of rugby league and rugby union
Players who have converted from one football code to another

Footnotes

References
 Whiticker, Alan (2004) Captaining the Kangaroos, New Holland, Sydney
 Whiticker, Alan & Hudson, Glen (2006) The Encyclopedia of Rugby League Players, Gavin Allen Publishing, Sydney
 Andrews, Malcolm (2006) The ABC of Rugby League Austn Broadcasting Corpn, Sydney
 Pollard, Jack (1984) Australian Rugby Union: The Game and the Players Angus and Robertson Publishing
 Fagan, Sean (2000–2006) http://www.rl1908.com

Further reading

 
Lists of rugby league players
dual-code